Philippe Streiff (26 June 1955 – 23 December 2022) was a French racing driver. He participated in 55 Formula One Grands Prix, debuting on 21 October 1984.  He achieved one podium, and scored a total of 11 championship points.

left him a quadriplegic and thus using a wheelchair, with the quality of the care he received in the aftermath having been called into question, even if the accident itself was so serious the roll-bar broke on impact.

Streiff organised the Masters Karting Paris Bercy.

In early 1994, Streiff made a bid to purchase Ligier in partnership with Hughes de Chaunac. The bid had the support of the similarly Renault-powered Williams F1 team, who intended to turn Ligier into a 'junior' team. The bid was unsuccessful.

Belgian Luc Costermans, who had broken the World blind road speed record in late 2008, dedicated his record to Streiff.

Streiff died on 23 December 2022, at the age of 67.

Racing record

Career summary

Complete 24 Hours of Le Mans results

Complete European Formula Three results

(key) (Races in bold indicate pole position) (Races 
in italics indicate fastest lap)

Complete European Formula Two Championship results
(key) (Races in bold indicate pole position; races in italics indicate fastest lap)

Complete International Formula 3000 Championship results
(key) (Races in bold indicate pole position; races in italics indicate fastest lap)

Complete Formula One results
(key)

Notes and references

External links

1955 births
2022 deaths
Sportspeople from La Tronche
French racing drivers
French Formula One drivers
European Formula Two Championship drivers
French Formula Three Championship drivers
AGS Formula One drivers
Ligier Formula One drivers
Tyrrell Formula One drivers
Renault Formula One drivers
International Formula 3000 drivers
24 Hours of Le Mans drivers
World Sportscar Championship drivers
24 Hours of Spa drivers
People with tetraplegia
Mercedes-AMG Motorsport drivers
Team Joest drivers
Sauber Motorsport drivers